is a railway station on the Seibu Shinjuku Line in Suginami, Tokyo, Japan, operated by the private railway operator Seibu Railway.

Lines

History
Iogi Station opened on 16 April 1927. Station numbering was introduced on all Seibu Railway lines during fiscal 2012, with Iogi Station becoming "SS11".

Passenger statistics
In fiscal 2013, the station was the 52nd busiest on the Seibu network with an average of 19,863 passengers daily.

The passenger figures for previous years are as shown below.

References

External links

Iogi station information 

Railway stations in Tokyo
Railway stations in Japan opened in 1927